Hemsterhuis is the name of several people:
Tiberius Hemsterhuis (1685 - 1766), Dutch philologist and critic
François Hemsterhuis (1721 - 1790), Dutch writer on aesthetics and moral philosophy, son of Tiberius